Woondul is a locality in the Toowoomba Region, Queensland, Australia.

Geography 
The north-west of the locality is within the Bulli State Forest. The eastern part of the locality is the Wondul Range National Park. There is a small area of farmland in the south-east.

History 
In 1852, the pastoral run Woondul was transferred from Thomas DeLacy Moffat to Russell H. Stuart. The locality is named after a pastoral run.

References 

Toowoomba Region
Localities in Queensland